Bucakköy is a village in the District of Kuyucak, Aydın Province, Turkey. As of 2010, it had a population of 441 people.

References

Villages in Kuyucak District